Mark Cox may refer to:

Mark Cox (tennis) (born 1943), British tennis player
Mark Cox (poet) (born 1956), American poet
Mark Cox (rugby league) (born 1978), English rugby league player
Mark Cox (actor) (born 1972), Scottish comedian and actor
Mark Cox, Jr. (1905–1979), English cricketer
Mark Cox (cricketer) (1879–1968), English cricketer

See also
Mark Cocks, musician now known as Mark Hamilton
John Mark Cox Jr., first African American to attend Rollins College